The Guyana national badminton team represents Guyana in international badminton team competitions. The Guyanese junior team have competed in the BWF World Junior Championships mixed team event, which is also called the Suhandinata Cup.

The Guyanese team have never competed in the Pan American Badminton Championships.

Participation in BWF competitions 
Suhandinata Cup

Current squad 

Male players
Akili Haynes
Tyrese Jeffrey
Narayan Ramdhani

Female players
Jayde Dasilva
Priyanna Ramdhani

References 

Badminton
National badminton teams